Triplophysa zhenfengensis is a species of stone loach in the genus Triplophysa. It is endemic to China and first discovered in Guangxi.

References

Z
Freshwater fish of China
Endemic fauna of China
Fish described in 2001